Homoeographa lanceolella is a species of snout moth. It was described by Émile Louis Ragonot in 1888 and is found in Peru.

References

Phycitinae
Moths described in 1888